Kampong Beribi is a village in Brunei-Muara District, Brunei, as well as a neighbourhood in the capital Bandar Seri Begawan. The population was 5,679 in 2016. It is one of the villages within Mukim Gadong 'B'. The postcode is BE1118.

Administration 
Apart from being a village subdivision, the village has also been subsumed under the municipal area of the capital Bandar Seri Begawan.

Education 
The main campus of Kemuda Institute is located in Beribi; Kemuda Institute is one of the few private, post-secondary institutions providing vocational courses.

There is a government primary school in Beribi, namely Beribi Telanai Primary School, which provides general primary education to the resident pupils. The  or the Islamic religious primary education, which is compulsory for the Muslim pupils in the country, is also provided in Beribi at Beribi Religious School.

Economy 
The main commercial activity in Beribi is located at the Beribi Industrial area. The area is managed by the Darussalam Enterprise or DARe, a statutory body, which provides infrastructural facilities for light industry- and services-related businesses. The area comprises the Beribi Industrial Site and Complex, which provides land and building units respectively.

Miscellaneous 
Kampong Beribi Mosque is the primary mosque for the Muslim residents, mainly to fulfill the need for Jumu'ah or the congregational Friday prayers. The mosque has congregational capacity of 500 at one time.

References 

Villages in Brunei-Muara District
Neighbourhoods in Bandar Seri Begawan